Whitnall School District is a school district located in southwestern Milwaukee County, Wisconsin, which serves portions of the cities of Franklin, Greenfield, plus all of the village of Hales Corners. Its offices are located on the grounds of Whitnall High School in Greenfield. The district is named after Charles B. Whitnall, who was Milwaukee's first Socialist City Treasurer from 1910 - 1912 and designed the Milwaukee County Parks System.

Schools
Whitnall High School, Greenfield
Whitnall Middle School, Greenfield
Edgerton Elementary, Hales Corners
Hales Corners Elementary, Hales Corners

See also
List of school districts in Wisconsin
List of high schools in Wisconsin

References

External links

Map of the school district

School districts in Wisconsin
Education in Milwaukee County, Wisconsin